Kai Khusrau may refer to:

Kaykhusraw (disambiguation), (multiple monarchs of the Seljuk dynasty)
Ghiyas al-Din Kai-Khusrau of the Injuids (died 1338 or 1339)